Ramata Airport is an airport on Ramata Island in the Solomon Islands .

Airlines and destinations

External links
Solomon Airlines Routes

Airports in the Solomon Islands